This article lists the squads for the 2017 SheBelieves Cup, the 2nd edition of the SheBelieves Cup. The cup consisted of a series of friendly games, and was held in the United States from 1 to 7 March 2017. The four national teams involved in the tournament registered a squad of 23 players.

The age listed for each player is on 1 March 2017, the first day of the tournament. The club listed is the club for which the player last played a competitive match prior to the tournament. The nationality for each club reflects the national association (not the league) to which the club is affiliated. A flag is included for coaches that are of a different nationality than their own national team.

Squads

England
Coach:  Mark Sampson

The final squad was announced on 21 February 2017. On 26 February 2017, Jo Potter withdrew from the squad due to a knee injury and was replaced by Gemma Bonner.

France
Coach: Olivier Echouafni

The final squad was announced on 21 February 2017.

Germany
Coach: Steffi Jones

The final squad was announced on 13 February 2017. On 17 February 2017, Tabea Kemme and Svenja Huth withdrew from the squad due to injuries and were replaced by Verena Faißt and Hasret Kayikçi.

United States
Coach: Jill Ellis

The final squad was announced on 24 February 2017.

Player representation

By club
Clubs with 3 or more players represented are listed.

By club nationality

By club federation

By representatives of domestic league

References

2017
2017 in American women's soccer
2017 in women's association football
2016–17 in English women's football
March 2017 sports events in the United States